Petalura gigantea, the giant dragonfly or south-eastern petaltail, is one of the world's largest dragonflies, with the males having an abdomen 6-7.5 cm long and a wingspan up to 11 cm, while females have an abdomen 8-9.5 cm long and a wingspan up to 12.5 cm.

The giant dragonfly occurs along the east coast of NSW from the Victorian border to northern NSW, and is not found west of the Great Dividing Range. There are known occurrences in the Blue Mountains and Southern Highlands, in the Clarence River catchment, and on a few coastal swamps from north of Grafton to Nadgee in the south. It is unusual not only in size, but also in having predominantly terrestrial habits at the larval stage. The giant dragonfly is listed as endangered under the NSW Threatened Species Conservation Act. This listing was transferred to the equivalent schedules under the Biodiversity Conservation Act 2016 (NSW) from August 2017. 

Petalura gigantea is a species of dragonfly in the family Petaluridae.
Petalura gigantea usually rests in sedges or shrubs while in copula, this usually occurs within a wetland area or an ecosystem based on peat (the accumulation of decayed vegetation or organic matter.

Gallery

See also
 List of Odonata species of Australia

References

External links
Giant Dragonfly - Wingecarribbee
ABC Online - Giant Dragonflies
South-eastern Petaltail at Faunanet

Petaluridae
Odonata of Australia
Insects of Australia
Endemic fauna of Australia
Taxa named by William Elford Leach
Insects described in 1815